Daniel Lubetzky (born 1968) is a Mexican American billionaire businessman, philanthropist, author, and founder and executive chairman of snack company Kind LLC.

Biography
Daniel Lubetzky is the son of Sonia and Roman Lubetzky. A Holocaust survivor and a Lithuanian Ashkenazi Jew, Lubetzky's father was a partner in International Bonded Warehouses and  United Export Trading Association, both duty-free shop chains with headquarters in Laredo, Texas. Lubetzky was born and raised in Mexico City, Mexico. As a teenager, he moved with his family to the U.S.

He received a Bachelor of Arts degree in economics and international relations, graduating magna cum laude, from Trinity University in San Antonio, Texas. As an undergraduate, he studied abroad in both Israel and France. Lubetzky then earned his Juris Doctor from Stanford Law School in 1993.

In March 2008, Lubetzky married Michelle Lynn Lieberman, a physician. They have four children. Lubetzky is the cousin of 3 time Oscar-winning cinematographer Emmanuel Lubezki.

Business career 
During his college years in Texas, Lubetzky created a retail watch operation, Da'Leky Times. After graduating from law school, Lubetzky worked briefly at Sullivan & Cromwell and at McKinsey & Company.

In 1993, Lubetzky was awarded a Haas Koshland Fellowship to write about legislative means to foster joint ventures between Arabs and Israelis. While carrying out his research, he discovered a sun-dried tomato product that provided the foundation for PeaceWorks Inc. in 1994. PeaceWorks is a "not-Only-for-profit" business corporation pursuing both peace and profit. Its flagship brand – Meditalia –is made through cooperation among neighbors striving to co-exist in the Middle East.

In 2003, concerned about unhealthy snacking choices and the rising obesity and diabetes epidemic in America, Lubetzky launched Kind Snacks with the value proposition of being "Kind to your body, your taste buds and your world". Kind has since become the fastest-growing snack company in the US.

In 2010, Lubetzky co-founded Maiyet, a luxury fashion venture committed to forging partnerships with artisans in some of the world's developing economies to create high end and unique products, while promoting self-sufficiency and entrepreneurship.

In 2015, President Barack Obama and Commerce Secretary Penny Pritzker named him a Presidential Ambassador for Global Entrepreneurship (PAGE). In 2018, Lubetzky founded New York-based family office, Equilibra, which backs entrepreneur-run businesses that offer packaged goods to consumers; investments include Greek yogurt brand Ellenos, and social enterprise Yellow Leaf Hammocks. As of November 2021, Lubetzky had a net worth of $2.2 billion.

In November 2020, it was announced that Kind North America would be purchased by Mars in a deal worth $5 billion. Lubetzky said he would retain his stake in the company and remain involved in its operations.

In September 2021, Lubetzky teamed up with two of Kind's former executives to create Somos (meaning "we are" in Spanish), an authentic Mexican food company.

Investments
Lubetzky established Equilibra Partners Management Inc in 2018. The firm backs entrepreneur-run businesses that offer packaged goods to consumers.

In May 2020, Equilibra purchased a 25% stake in Yellow Leaf Hammocks for $1 million when Lubetzky sat as a guest shark on Shark Tank.

In 2020, Equilibra invested $18 million in Greek yogurt company Ellenos. Towards the end of the year, it made a $250,000 investment in FitFighter, a fitness brand which began with equipment for firefighter training programs and expanded to full-body fitness tools and workouts.

In 2021, Equilibra purchased a 10% stake in Quevos, an egg white protein snacks company, also on Shark Tank. That same year, they invested in Tandm Inc., a family-owned business that created a tandem boogie board.

Other investments include: Cava Group, Justin's, Krave jerky, gimMe snacks and Chapul.

Media
Lubetzky is the author of the New York Times bestselling book Do the Kind Thing, Think Boundlessly, Work Purposefully, Live Passionately. The book is based on Lubetzky's entrepreneurial experience, and was inspired by his father's stories from the Holocaust. Lubetzky has also published multiple "Opinion" posts to CNN describing his opinions on how to stop violent extremists and lessons he will pass onto to his children.

Lubetzky has appeared as a recurring guest shark in episodes of Shark Tank in seasons 11, 12  13, and 14, and on To Dine For with Kate Sullivan in January, 2021.

Philanthropy 
In 2002, he co-founded the OneVoice Movement, an international grassroots effort, to amplify the voices of moderate Israelis and Palestinians seeking to end the conflict.

In 2015, Lubetzky and Kind Snacks created the Kind Foundation. Its signature initiative, Empatico, is a video-conferencing and digital learning platform that connects classrooms around the world designed to help kids explore their similarities and differences and expand their world views.

In 2017, he launched a public advocacy organization called Feed the Truth to counteract the food industry's influence on food policy and public health. He pledged $25 million to fund the organization.

In 2019, he was appointed to the Anti-Defamation League's inaugural board of directors.

In April 2020, Lubetzky's Kind Foundation launched the Frontline Impact Project in consultation with Project N95. The project is a platform for healthcare and other frontline responders to request resources needed in the fight against COVID-19.  As of May 14, Frontline Impact Project has partnered with more than 40 brands like Unilever, Nestle, and Mars Incorporated, reaching more than 180,000 people working mostly in hospitals, nursing homes, and outpatient medical practices.

Awards and recognition 
Koshland Fellowship
100 Global Leaders for Tomorrow by the World Economic Forum
Trinity Outstanding Alumnus Award 
World Association of NGOs bestowed him with its Peace, Reconciliation and Security Award 
Catholic Theological Union's Blessed Are the Peacemakers Award
King Hussein Humanitarian Leadership Prize 
Named Young Leaders Forum Fellow by National Committee for United States-China Relations
Named as one of "43 Entrepreneurs Who Are Changing the World" by Fast Company. 
Recognized as a Young Global Leader by World Economic Forum. 
Skoll Award for Social Entrepreneurship.
Named among "America's Most Promising Social Entrepreneurs" by Bloomberg News.
Named among "25 Responsibility Pioneers" of social innovation by Time magazine.
Selected as Entrepreneur of the Year by Entrepreneur magazine. 
Named among Advertising Age 50 Most Creative People.
Named among 100 Most Intriguing Entrepreneurs by Goldman Sachs.
Ernst & Young Entrepreneur of the Year 2013 Award.
Heroes of Conscious Capitalism 2017 Common Ground Awards Winner
Hispanic Heritage Award 
Horatio Alger Award

References

External links 
 Jewish Community Federation of San Francisco 
  World Economic Forum 
 Skoll Foundation 
 Trinity University 
 World Association of NGOs 
 King Hussein Foundation 

Living people
Mexican Jews
People from Mexico City
American people of Mexican descent
Trinity University (Texas) alumni
Stanford Law School alumni
1968 births
21st-century American businesspeople
American philanthropists
American billionaires
20th-century American Jews
21st-century American Jews